Rencontre Bay is natural bay on the island of Newfoundland in the province of Newfoundland and Labrador, Canada. It is near Devil Bay.

References

Bays of Newfoundland and Labrador